Braxton may refer to:


Places in the United States
 Braxton, Mississippi, a village
 Braxton County, West Virginia

People
 Braxton (given name), a list of people with the given name
 Braxton (surname), a list of people with the surname

Other uses
 The Braxtons, an American R&B girl group
 USS Braxton (APA-138), a World War II attack transport